Mlinarjev Janez: Slovenski junak ali uplemenitba Teharčanov is a novel by Slovenian author Ferdo Kočevar. It was first published in 1859.

See also
List of Slovenian novels

Slovenian novels
1859 novels